North Wiltshire is a constituency represented in the House of Commons of the UK Parliament since 1997 by James Gray, a Conservative. In the period 1832–1983, this was an alternative name for Chippenham or the Northern Division of Wiltshire and as Chippenham dates to the original countrywide Parliament, the Model Parliament, this period is covered in more detail in that article. In 2016 it was announced that the North Wiltshire constituency would be scrapped as part of the planned 2018 Constituency Reforms.

Boundaries 

1832–1885: The Hundreds of Chippenham, North Damerham, Bradford, Melksham, Potterne and Cannings, Calne, Selkley, Ramsbury, Whorwelsdown, Swanborough, Highworth, Cricklade and Staple, Kingsbridge, and Malmesbury.

1983–1997: The District of North Wiltshire.

1997–2010: The District of North Wiltshire wards of Allington, Ashton Keynes, Audley, Avon, Box, Bremhill, Brinkworth, Colerne, Corsham, Crudwell, Hill Rise, Hilmarton, Kington Langley, Kington St Michael, Lacock, Lyneham, Malmesbury, Malmesbury Road, Minety, Monkton Park, Neston and Gastard, Nettleton, Park, Pickwick, Purton, Queen's, Redland, St Paul Malmesbury Without, Sherston, Somerford, The Lydiards, Town, Westcroft, Wootton Bassett North, and Wootton Bassett South.

2010–present: The District of North Wiltshire wards of Ashton Keynes and Minety, Box, Bremhill, Brinkworth and The Somerfords, Calne Abberd, Calne Chilvester, Calne Lickhill, Calne Marden, Calne Priestley, Calne Quemerford, Calne Without, Colerne, Cricklade, Hilmarton, Kington Langley, Kington St Michael, Lyneham, Malmesbury, Nettleton, Purton, St Paul Malmesbury Without and Sherston, The Lydiards and Broad Town, Wootton Bassett North, and Wootton Bassett South.

The constituency covers most of the northern third of Wiltshire. However it excludes the eastern town of Swindon which is represented as North Swindon and South Swindon.

North Wiltshire constituency was formed by a renaming for the 1983 general election, with boundaries identical to the former Chippenham constituency (1885–1983). The constituency sits between the Cotswolds and Swindon. Its main towns are Calne, Royal Wootton Bassett (a town which was a borough constituency until abolished as a 'rotten borough' in 1832), Cricklade and Malmesbury, and it also contains a number of villages, both small and large, spread over a large area of farming countryside, including the well-known (often-painted and photographed) village of Castle Combe.

For the 2010 general election the North Wiltshire constituency changed radically as a result of boundary change recommendations. The constituency now covers a northern swathe of the previous version retaining the towns of Malmesbury, Cricklade, Royal Wootton Bassett and Calne while the largest southern town of Chippenham was given its own seat (which was previously abolished in 1983) that brought in the nearby market towns of Bradford on Avon and Melksham including parts of other seats.

While North Wiltshire has a long history of returning Conservative candidates, its district council (created in 1973 and abolished in 2009) was closely contested between the Conservatives and the Liberal Democrats with many electoral wards being marginal.

Members of Parliament

MPs 1832–1885

MPs since 1983

Elections

Elections in the 2010s

Elections in the 2000s

Elections in the 1990s

Elections in the 1980s

Elections in the 1880s

Elections in the 1870s

Elections in the 1860s

 

 
 

 Caused by Sotheron-Estcourt's resignation due to ill health.

Elections in the 1850s

 
 

 

 Caused by Sotheron-Estcourt's appointment as Home Secretary

 

 Caused by Sotheron-Estcourt's appointment as President of the Poor Law Board

Elections in the 1840s

 
 

 

 Caused by Burdett's death.

Elections in the 1830s

See also 
 List of parliamentary constituencies in Wiltshire

Notes

References

Parliamentary constituencies in Wiltshire
Constituencies of the Parliament of the United Kingdom established in 1832
Constituencies of the Parliament of the United Kingdom disestablished in 1885
Constituencies of the Parliament of the United Kingdom established in 1983